Mao Daolin (born January 1963) is an internet tycoon.  He is a former chief executive officer of Sina.com. He married then-CCP general secretary Hu Jintao's daughter, Hu Haiqing, in 2003.

Biography
Mao was born in 1963 in Shanghai. He graduated from Shanghai East-China Model High School in 1980. Mao then entered the Computer Department of Shanghai Jiaotong University. Later he went to Stanford University for a master's degree.

Since graduating from Shanghai East-China Model High School in 1980, Mao has been heavily involved in the computer industry. He started his own software company in 1982 and later served as a consultant from 1988 to 1993. The following year, in 1984, he joined Walden, an international risk investment company, as a vice-president.

Mao was a strong advocate for the merger of Stone Richsight and Huanyuan Consultation. From 1996 to 2001, he served as the chief operating officer at Sina.com. In 2002, he became Sina.com's chief executive officer.

Hu is now a San Francisco-based venture capitalist with Walden International Investment Group.

References

External links
Biography from chinavitae.com.

1963 births
Living people
Businesspeople from Shanghai
Shanghai Jiao Tong University alumni
Hu Jintao family
Sina Corp people